Daisy Maria Martinez is an actress, model, chef, television personality, and author, who hosted a PBS television series, Daisy Cooks!, which launched on April 15, 2005.

Career
Daisy was born to stateside Puerto Rican parents in Brooklyn, New York, and they lived with her grandmother until she was almost five years old. From her grandmother, Valentina, and her mother, Conchita, Daisy developed an appreciation of Latin cuisine. She attended Long Island University, where she met her first husband.

Before becoming a TV chef, Daisy was an actress and model. She became the Martinez Valero Girl for the Spanish shoe company by the same name. Daisy appeared in American commercials for Ford, and in Spanish-language commercials for AT&T. She has also appeared in Carlito’s Way and Scent of a Woman.

In 1998, Daisy matriculated at The French Culinary Institute, where she won first prize for her final project, "The Passionate Palate". Shortly after graduation, Daisy worked on the set of PBS' Lidia's Italian-American Kitchen as a prep-kitchen chef. In 2005, she did "Daisy Cooks" for PBS. She worked as a private chef in New York City for three years. In addition, Daisy managed a small catering business, "The Passionate Palate", which she continues to operate.

One of her books was IACP nominee and winner of the Best Latino Cuisine Cookbook in the World by the Gourmand World Cookbook Awards.

In January 2009, she hosted a six episode series, Viva Daisy!, on Food Network.

Daisy currently resides in Brooklyn, NY. She is divorced from her husband Jerry, a medical doctor. She is the mother of four children: Marc, Erik, David, and Angela.

References

External links 
 Official website
 
 Article on Daisy Martinez - FCI Review, French Culinary Institute of New York City newsletter

Living people
American television chefs
Food Network chefs
International Culinary Center alumni
American cookbook writers
Women cookbook writers
American women chefs
American women non-fiction writers
Year of birth missing (living people)
21st-century American women